Tishinka is a rural locality (a selo) and the administrative center of Tishinsky Selsoviet, Rubtsovsky District, Altai Krai, Russia. The population was 454 as of 2013. There are 6 streets.

Geography 
Tishinka is located 43 km north of Rubtsovsk (the district's administrative centre) by road. Novorossiysky is the nearest rural locality.

References 

Rural localities in Rubtsovsky District